Richard Leveson-Gower (30 April 1726 – 19 October 1753) was the fourth son of John Leveson-Gower, 1st Earl Gower and a member of the Leveson-Gower family.

He served as Member of Parliament for Lichfield from 1747 until his death, aged 27.

References
Burkes Peerage and Baronetage (1939), s.v. Sutherland, Duke of

1726 births
1753 deaths
Younger sons of earls
Members of the Parliament of Great Britain for English constituencies
Richard Leveson-Gower
British MPs 1747–1754